Stats NZ defines 53 Functional Urban Areas (Statistical standard for geographic areas 2023):

Metropolitan Areas
Auckland (1,547,619)
Christchurch (470,814)
Wellington (414,033)
Hamilton (198,957)
Tauranga (156,096)
Dunedin (125,007)

Large Regional Centres
Palmerston North (92,004)
Whangārei (84,117)
Nelson (79,998)
New Plymouth (79,074)
Hastings (75,255)
Rotorua (67,179)
Napier (64,767)
Invercargill (54,084)
Kapiti (46,683)
Whanganui (44,403)
Gisborne (39,447)

Medium Regional Centres
Timaru (38,559)
Masterton (32,043)
Blenheim (30,099)
Taupō (28,068)
Levin (25,803)
Queenstown (24,693)
Whakatāne (21,828)
Ashburton (21,672)
Cambridge (21,261)
Te Awamutu (19,677)
Feilding (17,727)
Oamaru (15,255)
Tokoroa (13,710)
Wānaka (12,633)
Greymouth (11,604)

Small Regional Centres (Population 5000+)
Warkworth
Kerikeri
Kaitaia
Hāwera
Gore
Te Puke
Motueka
Thames
Morrinsville
Alexandra
Huntly
Matamata
Kawerau
Cromwell
Stratford
Ōtaki
Dannevirke
Marton
Whitianga
Katikati
Waihi

References

Functional